David Michael Gregory (born 1 October 1994) is an English professional footballer who plays as a goalkeeper for Ebbsfleet United on loan from Boreham Wood

Career
Gregory signed for Cambridge United from Crystal Palace on 4 June 2016 and made his league debut on 15 October covering for Will Norris who was suffering from tonsillitis, in a 0–1 defeat against Grimsby Town.

Following his release from Cambridge at the end of the season, Gregory joined his local side Bromley. He left the club at the end of the 2018/19 season.

Honours
Bromley
FA Trophy runner-up: 2017–18

References

Living people
1994 births
English footballers
Association football goalkeepers
Crystal Palace F.C. players
Harrow Borough F.C. players
Sutton United F.C. players
Bishop's Stortford F.C. players
Leyton Orient F.C. players
Cambridge United F.C. players
Bromley F.C. players
Boreham Wood F.C. players
Ebbsfleet United F.C. players
English Football League players
National League (English football) players
Isthmian League players
Footballers from Croydon
Eastbourne Borough F.C. players